The Memorial Armando Picchi was a summer association football friendly tournament that took place in Livorno, Italy, from 1971 to 1999. The tournament was organized in 1971 by the Italian Football Federation and the Lega Nazionale Professionisti in memory of Armando Picchi and was named Trofeo Nazionale di Lega Armando Picchi.

The trophy was designed by Alberto Lievore, working with Alvaro Marchini, and Italo Allodi to commemorate Armando Picchi, F.C. Internazionale Milano historical captain of the sixties, who died in May 1971. Competition in the initial plans was to take place annually in the month of June, with the participation of fixed (according to the rules of the time) the first two Cup finalists Italy and the top two teams in Serie A, but problems of overlapping dates it to the only organization limited the inaugural edition. First edition was played at the Stadio Olimpico in Rome. Other editions played at Stadio di Ardenza in Livorno, which changed name into Stadio Armando Picchi in 1990. 

In 1971 the tournament was contested by 4 teams, with semifinals, third place match and final. In 1999 the teams played 3 round-robin 90-minute matches. If any match ended in a draw, it was decided by penalties.

Finals

References

External links
 Memorial Armando Picchi at Rec.Sport.Soccer Statistics Foundation.

Defunct Italian football friendly trophies
1971–72 in Italian football
1988–89 in Italian football
1989–90 in Italian football
1995–96 in Italian football
1999–2000 in Italian football
Recurring sporting events established in 1971
Recurring events disestablished in 1999
1971 establishments in Italy